James Steen (March 28, 1913 – November 23, 1983) was an American football player.  Steen attended New Rochelle High School and Syracuse University. He played college football for the Syracuse Orange football team and was selected by the United Press, Liberty magazine and the Central Press Association as a first-team tackle on the 1934 College Football All-America Team. He also played professional football in the National Football League from 1935 to 1936 for the Detroit Lions.

References

1913 births
1983 deaths
American football tackles
Detroit Lions players
Syracuse Orange football players
Sportspeople from New Rochelle, New York
Players of American football from New York City
New Rochelle High School alumni